Geomdan Oryu Station is a subway station on Line 2 of the Incheon Subway in Seo District, Incheon, South Korea.

The nearby is Geomdan Industrial Complex, Oryu Jubak Station, Sugolgol Village, and the district to be developed in Oryu housing. It is the northern terminus of Line 2.

Station layout

References

External links

Metro stations in Incheon
Seoul Metropolitan Subway stations
Railway stations opened in 2016
Seo District, Incheon
Incheon Subway Line 2